Alexandre O. Philippe is a Swiss film director best known for the documentary films Doc of the Dead, The People vs. George Lucas, and the 2017 post-modern documentary examination of the Psycho shower scene directed by Alfred Hitchcock entitled 78/52 which premiered at the 2017 Sundance Film Festival. Philippe is Creative Director and co-owner of Denver-based Cinema Vertige and his most recent commissioned work for the City of Denver garnered four Heartland Emmy Awards.

Career
Phillippe received a MFA in Dramatic Writing from New York University's Tisch School of the Arts. He has directed several narrative and documentary shorts, including Left, the Spot and Inside, which screened at over 70 international film festivals, and won several awards. Left  was the first film to have been recorded, edited and mixed at 192 kHz/24-bit for Dolby’s process of lossless encoding in TrueHD 5.1 surround sound technology, and was honoured by the Akira Kurosawa Foundation in Japan. The People vs. George Lucas was his third feature documentary, after Chick Flick (about Mike the Headless Chicken) and Earthlings, an examination of the Klingon language phenomenon. He was also Second Unit Director on Dirk Simon’s When the Dragon Swallowed the Sun ), which premiered at the 2010 Santa Barbara International Film Festival, won three Movie Maverick Awards.

Phillippe's 2017 documentary 78/52 deconstructs the infamous shower scene from director Alfred Hitchcock's Psycho. Film critic Owen Gleiberman of Variety remarked "Directed by Alexandre O. Philippe, who made the elegant and searching Doc of the Dead, 78/52 centers on an up-close analysis of the shower scene that’s at once delirious and definitive; the movie is also a cinematic meditation that features a wealth of terrific anecdotes about the creation of Hitchcock’s masterpiece." The documentary features interviews with actors Elijah Wood and Jamie Lee Curtis (daughter of star Janet Leigh), Osgood Perkins (son of Anthony Perkins), directors Peter Bogdanovich, Guillermo del Toro, Eli Roth, Karyn Kusama,  film editors Walter Murch, Chris Innis, Bob Murawski, and Marli Renfro (body double for Janet Leigh). The title refers to the number of set ups in the scene and the number of cuts, each one dissected and analyzed by film historians and enthusiasts. Kenneth Turan of the Los Angeles Times reviewed the film, expressing that it is "obsessive but accessible, the deepest dive imaginable into one of the most celebrated scenes in movie history, the documentary "78/52" looks at a brief three minutes of cinema the way it's never been looked at before."

Film

 2003 Chick Flick: The Miracle Mike Story (Documentary)
 2004 Earthlings: Ugly Bags of Mostly Water (Documentary)
 2006 Left (Short)
 2008  The Spot (Documentary short)
 2009  Inside (Short)
 2010 The People vs. George Lucas (Documentary)
 2011 The Right to Breathe (Documentary short)
 2012 The Life and Times of Paul the Psychic Octopus (Documentary)
 2014 Doc of the Dead (Documentary)
 2017 78/52 (Documentary) - Distributed by IFC
 2019 Memory: The Origins of Alien (Documentary)
 2020 Leap of Faith: William Friedkin on The Exorcist (Documentary)
 2023 You Can Call Me Bill (Documentary)

References

External links 
 

Swiss documentary film directors
Living people
Tisch School of the Arts alumni
Year of birth missing (living people)